Synaptogyrin 3 is a protein that in humans is encoded by the SYNGR3 gene.

Function

This gene encodes an integral membrane protein. The exact function of this protein is unclear, but studies of a similar murine protein suggest that it is a synaptic vesicle protein that also interacts with the dopamine transporter. The gene product belongs to the synaptogyrin gene family. [provided by RefSeq, Dec 2010].

References

Further reading